Gymnoi sto dromo or Gimni sto dromo (Naked in the street) is a 1969 Greek drama film directed and written by Giannis Dalianidis and starring Zoi Laskari, Nikos Kourkoulos, Vangelis Silinos, Andreas Barkoulis and Chronis Exarchakos.  The story is about a wealthy lady (Zoi Laskari) which she falls in love with a poor worker (Nikos Kourkoulos) and took part in reactions of the circle in which himself had a fiancée with a girl from his block.

Cast

Zoi Laskari ..... Xenia Koumarianou
Nikos Kourkoulos ..... Andreas
Vangelis Seilinos ..... Christos
Andreas Barkoulis ..... Xenia's friend
Sofia Roubou ..... Anna
Efi Arvanti
Kia Bozou ..... neighbour
Toula Diakopoulou
Chronis Exarchakos
Maria Foka ..... Anna's mother
Popi Giamarelou
Dimitra Papachristou ..... neighbour
Nikos Papanastassiou ..... Mitsos's brother
Vangelis Pavlou
Anni Stavraki
Kostas Tsianos

External links

Gymnoi sto dromo

1969 films
1960s Greek-language films
1969 drama films
Finos Film films
Greek drama films
Films directed by Giannis Dalianidis